Nicola Simonelli (born 20 January 1958) is a Venezuelan footballer. He played in three matches for the Venezuela national football team in 1985. He was also part of Venezuela's squad for the 1983 Copa América tournament.

References

1958 births
Living people
Venezuelan footballers
Venezuela international footballers
Place of birth missing (living people)
Association football midfielders
Aragua F.C. managers